Theodore "Ted" Grant is a fictional character, a DC Comics superhero, known as the original Wildcat and a long-time member of the Justice Society of America (JSA). A world-class heavyweight boxer, Grant became inadvertently entangled in the criminal underworld and developed a costumed identity to clear his name.

Modern depictions of Wildcat show him to be a rowdy, tough guy with a streak of male chauvinism, leading to frequent clashes with the relatively progressive Power Girl, as well as exploring some of the character's insecurities. Meanwhile, a magical "nine lives" spell has explained his vitality at an old age. Like many older JSA members, he has been a mentor to younger heroes, particularly the second Black Canary.

Ted Grant briefly appeared in an episode of Smallville, played by Roger Hasket. Grant’s Wildcat was also a recurring character on the third season of Arrow, played by J.R. Ramirez. He was a retired vigilante who was training Laurel Lance to become one. Wildcat also appeared in Stargirl, portrayed by Brian Stapf.

Publication history
The Ted Grant version of Wildcat first appeared in Sensation Comics #1 and was created by writer Bill Finger, and designed by illustrator Irwin Hasen. He continued in Sensation Comics until issue #90 (June 1949).

Fictional character biography
Theodore "Ted" Grant is a normal human who was magically given nine lives. He remains at the peak of human condition due to his extensive workouts. He is a world-class boxer who trained Batman, Black Canary, and even Superman in the art. He was trained to fighting condition by ex-boxer Joe Morgan; the same man who trained Grant's fellow mystery men, the Atom, and the Guardian.

Earth-Two
Ted Grant first donned the Wildcat costume in Sensation Comics #1 (January 1942), the same issue in which Mister Terrific premiered.

Wildcat's origin is chronicled in Sensation Comics #1 as well as Secret Origins #3 (1973) and All-Star Squadron Annual #1 (1982). Henry Grant vowed on his baby son's crib that the child would not grow up afraid of life, so he encouraged his son to participate in sports. Orphaned during the Great Depression, Ted Grant found himself unemployed in the big city. One night, he saved "Socker" Smith, the heavyweight boxing champion, from a mugging. "Socker" took Ted under his wing, and soon Ted became a heavyweight boxing champion in his own right. He also became tangled unknowingly in his manager's sinister plans. His mentor "Socker" Smith was killed by Grant's managers Flint and Skinner who used a syringe, loaded with poison, in a boxing glove. The dose was only intended to slow down Smith, but the duo misjudged the potency. When Grant was arrested for the crime, Flint and Skinner, afraid that he might know what had really happened, arranged for the young fighter to be killed. Grant escaped the attempt and survived, but the policemen with him were killed. As a result, he became a fugitive. Later, he came upon a child who had been robbed of his Green Lantern comic. The boy, describing the mystery-man Green Lantern, inspired Grant to create the costume of a large black cat. He took the name Wildcat and vowed to clear his name. He brought Flint and Skinner to justice; the criminals were forced to confess, clearing Grant's name, and obtaining justice for Smith. Using the identity of Wildcat, Grant continued to fight crime.

By issue #4, Wildcat had a custom motorbike, the Cat-o-Cycle and a comedy sidekick named Stretch Skinner.

In the pages of All Star Comics, Wildcat had a few adventures as a member of the Justice Society of America (JSA). In the 1980s, when the All-Star Squadron was published, it created a retroactive continuity in which the majority of WWII mystery-men interacted with each other. Wildcat had a place as a member of that conglomeration of heroes as well. The 1970s run of All Star Comics (1976–1979) had Wildcat play a central role as a JSA member. In the story arc, which saw Green Lantern go berserk, and Commissioner Bruce Wayne issue arrest warrants for the JSA, it was Wildcat's ability to look fear in the face that allowed him to defeat the real mastermind of the disaster: the second Psycho-Pirate.

In 1985, during the Crisis on Infinite Earths, Ted's legs were shattered by an out-of-control Red Tornado and he was told he would never walk again. He soon discovered that his goddaughter Yolanda Montez had recently become the second Wildcat.

Earth-One
An Earth-One version of Ted Grant existed Pre-Crisis and teamed up with Batman, himself a retired world heavyweight champion like his Earth-Two counterpart, on five occasions. This version of Ted Grant had a relatively minor career and his origin and early years were not chronicled.

This version of Ted Grant ceased to exist following the events of the Crisis on Infinite Earths, with the Earth-Two version becoming the dominant version in the new unified universe.

Post-Crisis
After the Crisis, the injuries that Ted had sustained were downgraded from paraplegia to less severe injuries from which he recovered quickly. He was also still a former heavyweight champion of the world. In addition, Ted is credited with being an expert at combat, though he prefers to trade punches as part of his brawling style. Even in his advanced years, on several occasions Ted has knocked out experienced fighters with a single punch.

Later, Ted was present when the JSA willingly exiled themselves into Limbo in order to prevent the Ragnarok (the end of the world as described in Norse mythology) as part of a time loop. He remained there for several years until he was freed with the rest of the JSA in Armageddon: Inferno. He was present during the Justice Society's disastrous fight with Extant during Zero Hour and fell victim to Extant's time manipulation powers, which restored Wildcat to his proper age, that of an elderly, sickly man. 

In the wake of Zero Hour, Wildcat retired from active crimefighting and again became a full-time trainer in his role as a professional boxer. In private, he continued to train younger superheroes in the martial arts. In addition, new details were revealed about Wildcat's past, one being the existence of two sons. His eldest son Jake was kidnapped by the Yellow Wasp and later murdered by Killer Wasp. His youngest son Tom was raised exclusively by the boy's mother without Ted's knowledge.

Ted also had torrid affairs with Selina Kyle, as well as an affair with a time-displaced Queen Hippolyta.

Twice during his Post-Zero Hour retirement, Ted was severely injured defending innocent lives. He received the first injury defending patrons of the bar Warriors, run by the ex-Green Lantern Guy Gardner. Later, he was injured in rescue operation during a planet-wide snowfall. On both occasions, he was treated on site at Warriors and miraculously recovered from his injuries.

It was later revealed that Ted possesses "nine lives", the result of the magician Zatara altering a curse placed upon him by a sorcerer named King Inferno after Ted refused to throw a boxing match for the wizard. Ted was given nine lives as opposed to being turned into a cat as King Inferno wanted. Since then, Ted has lost his nine lives as a result of a variety of deaths, many of which occurred off-panel. In JSA #34, Mordru told Ted that he had nine lives for every "cycle", although Mordru did not define a cycle's duration. This meant that Ted had somehow regained his spent lives. In JSA #36, this was confirmed; Ted gained nine lives at any given time, meaning that he had to be killed nine times in rapid succession to be killed permanently.

DC Universe
In the "Watchmen" sequel "Doomsday Clock", Wildcat is among the superheroes that return after Doctor Manhattan was inspired by Superman to undo the experiment on the timeline that erased the Justice Society and the Legion of Super-Heroes. He was seen with Yolanda Montez in her Wildcat attire.

In the pages of "Dark Nights: Death Metal", Wildcat was with Alan Scott, Jay Garrick, and Doctor Fate where they guarded the Valhalla Cemetery.

Powers and abilities
Ted Grant is an expert fighter and a world champion boxer at the peak of his physical condition. He is also highly skilled at other martial arts, such as capoeira, hapkido, kickboxing, krav maga, muay thai, and taekwondo. He was given "nine lives" as a result of a magical spell, which explains his longevity; these nine lives have not only kept him young, but also restore him to life if he is explicitly killed. He is also surprisingly strong and superbly agile.

When the Ultra-Humanite was able to mind-control all the heroes and villains on Earth, he was unable to control Wildcat. Wildcat's resistance was never explained, other than by Ultra-Humanite quoting Mark Twain who said that a cat can never be "made the slave of the lash". Whether this was another cat-like ability Wildcat gained from the magical spell, or there is another reason, was never explained or referred to again. He can also cut through metal with his claws and land on his feet.

Enemies

Wildcat had his own rogues gallery during his career:
 Buzzard Bernay – A crooked boxing manager.
 The Caveman – John Grimm is a caveman-themed villain.
 Flint and Skinner – The managers of Ted Grant who orchestrated "Socker" Smith's death.
 Giles and Hogg – Two jewel thieves that posed as private detectives. Their activities led to Wildcat first meeting "Stretch" Skinner when the jewel thieves tried to scam him.
 The Headless Horseman – Van Brunt is a criminal who masquerades as the Headless Horseman.
 The Huntress – A female villain who is the mistress of traps and tracking.
 The Laughing Pirate – A pirate-themed villain.
 The Porker – A crime lord.
 The Purple Mask Gang
 Second Chance – Steve Styles is a criminal who took up the name Second Chance after being saved by Wildcat. He dies when a bullet meant for Wildcat ricochets back at him.
 The Yellow Wasp – A wasp-themed criminal who wields a stinger gun, rides the Waspmobile, and uses chemicals to control wasps. He went on a crime wave and kidnapped "Stretch" Skinner before being defeated by Wildcat. The Yellow Wasp later escapes from prison, kills the usurper of his gang, and leads his gang in a raid on Fetterman Arms Works. He and his gang are defeated by Wildcat and "Stretch" Skinner and the Yellow Wasp is returned to prison. The Yellow Wasp later escaped from prison and came up with a crime spree that revolved around him having a large swarm of wasps blanketing the sky. During a fight in the subway, Wildcat and "Stetch" Skinner defeated the Yellow Wasp and his men and returned them to prison. He later dies at some point and is revealed to be the father of Killer Wasp.

Other versions

DC: The New Frontier
Wildcat cameos as the world heavyweight champion, defending his title against Cassius Clay.

Kingdom Come
In Kingdom Come, Alex Ross (and writer Mark Waid) portrayed Wildcat as a humanoid black panther with the soul of Ted Grant. He is seen working with Batman's group and with the other offspring of the Justice League. It is not clear whether or not he dies when the UN unleashes a nuclear attack against the metahumans at the end of the comic.

The Sandman/Prez
Wildcat is portrayed as boxer (not superhero) Ted Grant in Prez Rickard's world in The Sandman: Worlds' End. A woman obsessed with Wildcat shoots at Prez and his girlfriend, killing her and injuring him. Prez has Wildcat spend several hours with him while he is at the hospital. It is said that there is no ill will between them – Prez even offered clemency to the assassin, but she was still sent to the electric chair.

Earth 2
In the story Earth 2: Worlds' End (a part of "The New 52" reboot) set in Earth 2, Ted Grant appears as a boxer living in the same World Army refugee camp as Dick and Barbara Grayson during Darkseid's invasion of Earth. After Barbara's death, Ted trains Dick in offensive and defensive fighting techniques and joins him on a mission to recover his lost son.

In other media

Television

Live-action

 Ted Grant makes a cameo appearance in the Smallville two-part episode "Absolute Justice", portrayed by Roger Hasket. This version is a member of the Justice Society of America (JSA), who were primarily active in the 1970s, until the government forced them to retire from superheroics. Despite this, Grant remained active as a professional boxer.
 Ted Grant appeared as a recurring character in the third season of Arrow, portrayed by J.R. Ramirez. This version runs the "Wildcat Gym" as a place to help kids on the streets by training them to box in the hopes it will steer them straight. Additionally, he originally operated as a vigilante who fought street crime in the Glades, but retired after his partner, Isaac Stanzler, beat someone to death; something he felt was morally wrong. In the present, he trains Laurel Lance, providing her the foundation she would later need to become a skilled combatant while training under Nyssa al Ghul. He later helps the Arrow and his allies defeat Stanzler, and stop Daniel Brickwell's siege on the Glades. Grant is wounded in the battle, though his fate was left unknown. Series producer Marc Guggenheim would later go on state that the character did not die.
 Ted Grant / Wildcat appears in Stargirl, portrayed by Brian Stapf. This version was a member of the Justice Society of America (JSA) who wore an exosuit that enhanced his natural athleticism to aid in his superheroics. In the pilot episode, Grant and the JSA were attacked by the Injustice Society, with an unknown opponent fatally throwing Grant out of a window. Ten years later, Yolanda Montez inherits Grant's suit and becomes the new Wildcat.

Animation

 Wildcat appeared in Justice League Unlimited, voiced by Dennis Farina. This version is a member of the Justice League who trains other members and serves as one of the group's front-line fighters.
 Wildcat appears in Batman: The Brave and the Bold, voiced by R. Lee Ermey. This version is a member of the Justice Society of America and one of Batman's mentors who strives to keep fighting crime despite his aging body. Additionally, an unnamed alternate universe version of Wildcat appears in flashbacks depicted in the episode "Deep Cover for Batman!" as a member of the Injustice Syndicate.
 Wildcat makes a cameo appearance in the Young Justice episode "Humanity". This version is a member of the Justice Society of America who was active in the 1930s.
 Wildcat appears in DC Super Hero Girls, voiced by John DiMaggio. This version works as a gym teacher at Super Hero High.

Film
 Wildcat appears in Justice League: The New Frontier. This version is a former member of the now retired Justice Society of America, which had disbanded after the death of Hourman.
 An alternate universe version of Wildcat makes a cameo appearance Justice League: Crisis on Two Earths as a minor member of the Crime Syndicate.
 Wildcat makes a brief appearance in Teen Titans Go! To the Movies.

Video games
 Wildcat appears in the Batman: The Brave and the Bold – The Videogame, voiced again by R. Lee Ermey.
 Wildcat appears in DC Universe Online, voiced by Ken Webster.

Toys
 Wildcat was the first figure released in the ninth wave of the DC Universe Classics line and was available in his black and blue costumes.
 Wildcat was released as part of the JSA Wave 3 from DC Direct on December 12, 2001. It is the first Wildcat action figure ever sold.

Miscellaneous
 Wildcat makes a cameo appearance in the Robot Chicken DC Comics Special. He fights alongside the Justice League against the Legion of Doom, only to be disintegrated by Darkseid.
 Wildcat appears in the Injustice 2 prequel comic as a member of Batman's Insurgency.

Reception
IGN listed Wildcat as the 71st greatest comic book character of all time stating that, due to his age as a superhero, he is almost more mystifying than the Spectre.

References

External links
 JSA Fact File: Wildcat I
 Earth-2 Wildcat Index
 Comic Book Profile: Earth-1 Wildcat (Ted Grant)

All-American Publications characters
Comics characters introduced in 1942
DC Comics male superheroes
DC Comics martial artists
DC Comics metahumans
DC Comics orphans
DC Comics superheroes
Earth-Two
Fictional characters with death or rebirth abilities
Fictional characters with slowed ageing
Fictional Krav Maga practitioners
Fictional professional boxers
Golden Age superheroes
Fictional characters displaced in time